Rollinia andicola is a species of tree in the Annonaceae family. It is found in Ecuador and Peru.

References

andicola
Trees of Ecuador
Trees of Peru
Near threatened plants
Taxonomy articles created by Polbot
Taxobox binomials not recognized by IUCN